Nemanja Kapetanović (born 3 February 1997) is a Serbian professional basketball player for Batumi of the Georgian Superliga.

Playing career 
Kapetanović was born in Belgrade, Serbia, FR Yugoslavia. He started to play basketball for youth teams of Belgrade-based teams; Crvena zvezda and Partizan.

During his professional career, Kapetanović played for Jagodina, Beovuk 72, Mega, Dynamic, Vršac, and Tamiš.

Nationale team career 
Kapetanović was a member of the Serbia U20 team that participated at the 2017 FIBA Europe Under-20 Championship in Greece. Over five tournament games, he averaged 8.4 points, 1.8 rebounds and 0.6 assists per game.

References

External links 
 RealGM profile
 ProBallers profile
 Eurobasket profile
 aba-liga profile

1997 births
Living people
ABA League players
Basketball League of Serbia players
Basketball players from Belgrade
KK Beovuk 72 players
KK Crvena zvezda youth players
KK Dynamic players
KK Jagodina players
KK Mega Basket players
KK Tamiš players
KK Vršac players
Serbian expatriate basketball people in Georgia (country)
Serbian men's basketball players
Shooting guards